Cubic Corporation is a global public transportation and defense corporation. It operates two business segments: Cubic Transportation Systems (CTS) and Cubic Mission and Performance Solutions (CMPS).

History
Cubic Corporation was founded in 1949 by Walter J. Zable as an electronics company in San Diego, California, and began operations in 1951. Zable devised the company name as he wanted the name to reflect both engineering and precision. Its first product was a calorimetric wattmeter, a device used for measuring microwave output. It became a publicly-traded company in 1959.

In 1969, the company acquired United States Elevator Corporation, a maker of freight and passenger elevators.

In early September 1984, Cubic moved its corporate domicile into Delaware General Corporation Law. The move was completed on June 11, 1985.

Cubic employs 6,200 people globally. Stevan Slijepcevic was named president and chief executive officer of Cubic Corporation in January 2022.

In May 2021, Cubic announced the completion of its sale to the private equity firms Veritas Capital and Evergreen Coast Capital, turning the publicly traded New York Stock Exchange company into a privately held company.

Company divisions 
Cubic's operating segments include:

 Cubic Mission and Performance Solutions provides networked command, control, communications, computers, intelligence, surveillance and reconnaissance (C4ISR) capabilities for defense, intelligence, security and commercial missions, as well as realistic combat training systems, secure communications, operations, maintenance, technical and other support services for the U.S. and allied nations.
 Cubic Defence New Zealand Ltd (previously, OSCMAR International Limited) is a manufacturer of training and simulations systems for military forces around the world. It is based in Auckland, New Zealand, and owned by Cubic Corporation.
 Cubic Transportation Systems designs, integrates, and provides outsourced business process and information technology services for automated fare collection systems for public transit operations. Additionally, this segment provides the fare payment infrastructure, including gates, ticket machines and smart card readers, and the back end or central system for processing and reporting revenue and other data. Services include customer support, software support, and operations services. CTS is the world's largest operator of public transport fare collection services. In addition to automated fare collection and associated services for public transit, CTS delivers Intelligent Transportation Solutions (ITS) to transportation authorities to improve safety, minimize congestion, enhance roadway planning, and provide real-time and historical performance analytics. Founded May 5, 1972.

Products and services

Cubic Transportation Systems provides the following products and services:
 Ticket machines
 Smartcard readers
 Fare-collection gates
Full-service mobility platform
Umo is a multi-modal platform that connects public and private mobility systems to optimize public transportation operations.
Umo keeps riders moving efficiently by offering multi-modal journey planning, contactless payments, real-time travel information, and loyalty rewards through the Umo Mobility App.
Umo also partners with media agencies on advertising and promotion.
 Revenue management back office and associated services
 Card-based
 Account-based: New York’s OMNY OMNY, Chicago's Ventra system(used by CTA, Pace and Metra), Brisbane’s GO card system, and London Oyster Cards are some of Cubic's account-based products.
Mobile: Cubic has deployed mobile applications in multiple locations in the United States and was the first to launch transit cards within the mobile wallet.
 Transit customer support
 Management services to transit agencies
 Real-time passenger information
UmoIQ is a real-time information-as-a-service solution that monitors transit system operations through global positioning systems on live maps.
 Operational planning assistance 
 Traffic management 
 Customers in the UK include the Highways Agency, Transport for London, and Transport Scotland. Cubic also works for Transport for New South Wales in Australia through the Intelligent Congestion Management Program (ICMP), which focuses on enhanced monitoring and management of the area's road network.
 Predictive analytics
 The Data Management & Analytics Platform (DMAP) equips transportation agencies with readily available tools that answer the toughest industry questions and provide real-time, actionable insights to drive operational excellence, improve service quality, and reduce costs. 
 Tolling
 Cubic created an integrated payment processing, customer service, and financial management platform for the tolling industry.
 Operational IT services 
 Asset management services
 Services include field maintenance, device support, depot repair and part supply, spares and obsolescence, and cash collection.
GRIDSMART 
In 2019, CTS acquired GRIDSMART for approximately $87 million in cash.
GRIDSMART specializes in video detection at the intersection using advanced image processing, computer vision modeling and machine learning along with a single camera solution – providing best-in-class data for optimizing the flow of people, bicycles, and traffic through intersections.
GRIDSMART has approximately 12,000 operating intersections.
Trafficware 
In 2018, CTS acquired Advanced Traffic Solutions Inc. ("Trafficware") for approximately $235.7 million in cash.
Trafficware provides a fully integrated suite of software, Internet of Things (IoT) devices, and hardware solutions that provide customers with enhanced mobility and improved safety.
Trafficware's Synchro Studio suite helps improve traffic operations of all sizes.
The SynchroGreen adaptive traffic control system optimizes signal timing for arterials, side streets, and pedestrians through real-time adaptive traffic control. 
Trafficware's Advanced Traffic Management System (ATMS) is used by more than 200 transportation authorities as the cornerstone of their central traffic management system.
Trafficware offers a portfolio of traffic controllers, including NEMA, CalTrans, and ATC designs. The range of options ensures seamless compatibility for its customers as they migrate (or upgrade) their current technology.
Trafficware also manufactures traffic cabinets to safely house traffic signal equipment and accessories.
Trafficware currently has 60,000 controllers in the field.

Projects

Cubic Transportation Systems has delivered over 400 projects in 40 markets on five continents. Cubic first implemented mobile ticketing technology in 2006 and produces multiple mobile fare collection options, including mobile ticketing through barcoding, NFC tools, contact and contactless smartcard payments, and traditional automated fare collection systems. The Umo Mobility Platform was launched in January 2021. Cubic Transportation Systems manages around 70% of the global market for smart transit cards. Cubic processes more than 24 billion transactions a year.

In 2017, Cubic was chosen to implement the AFC 2.0 project by the Massachusetts Bay Transportation Authority (MBTA), to update the MBTA's fare collection systems. This project was budgeted originally for $723 million, with a planned completion date of May 2021. As of May 2021, the cost of the project (now called "Fare Transformation") had risen to $935 million, with an updated completion date of 2024. In February 2023, the MBTA announced that it considered the project "unlikely to meet the current 2024 timeline for full implementation".

On October 21, 2022, it was announced that Waka Kotahi/New Zealand Transport Agency had signed a contract with Cubic for the development of their National Ticketing Solution. The National Ticketing Solution will allow the use of a single fare card on public transport across the whole of New Zealand.

Other units 
 DTECH Labs provides deployable and tactical communications products and solutions for military, government, first responders, and civilian customers.
 TeraLogics is a provider of real-time Full Motion Video Processing Exploitation and Dissemination for the Department of Defense, the intelligence community, and commercial customers based in Ashburn, Virginia.
 GATR Technologies manufactures portable, inflatable SATCOM and C4ISR terminals for tactical communications in harsh and forward or remote deployed environments.
 Vocality provides embedded technology that unifies communication platforms enabling its business, government, and military customers to communicate securely using legacy systems with the latest wireless and cellular networks.
 PIXIA Corp. is an imagery management company.

References

External links

 

Companies formerly listed on the New York Stock Exchange
Manufacturing companies based in San Diego
Manufacturing companies established in 1951
Defense companies of the United States
American companies established in 1951
2021 mergers and acquisitions
Private equity portfolio companies